The 1981 CFL season is considered to be the 28th season in modern-day Canadian football, although it is officially the 24th Canadian Football League season.

CFL News in 1981
The Eastern and Western Football Conferences, which had carried on as separate and autonomous entities since the founding of the CFL in 1958, agreed to a full merger prior to the start of the 1981 season.

With the merger, the Eastern and Western Football Conferences were dissolved and renamed as the East and West Divisions.

The merger authorized the CFL to have full authority over decisions, including the adoption of a full interlocking schedule for both divisions. All nine teams played each other twice, once home and once away, regardless of their affiliated division. Other than during the three seasons of the CFL's U.S. expansion era from 1993 to 1995, the League's teams played at least one game home and one away versus every other team in the League since the 1981 season; this continued until the 2021 season.

In addition, the merger set up the CFL Board of Governors and the CFL Management Council to replace the Executive Committee and the General Managers Committee. After the 1980 season, after owning the team for over ten years, Montreal Alouettes owner Sam Berger retired and sold the team to Nelson Skalbania, who brought in high priced NFL talent who did not adapt to the Canadian game, bringing a terrible losing season to Montreal (they did, however, make the playoffs due to the weak division that year), and with it, a loss of fan support, and he lost money and because of the high priced talent he bankrupted the team. So the team folded after the season, but a year later, a new team, the Montreal Concordes, owned by Expos owner Charles Bronfman, took over the team's players and history.

The East was so weak this season that the Calgary Stampeders, despite being the West's fifth place team, finished with a better record than the second place Ottawa Rough Riders. Ottawa nevertheless upset the Hamilton Tiger-Cats and qualified for the Grey Cup despite winning only five games in the regular season finishing seventh overall.

The ensuing controversy over having a 5–11 team playing in the Grey Cup played a large part in eventually persuading the league to implement a cross-over rule permitting a fourth place team in one division to qualify for the playoffs in place of a third place team in the other division with a weaker record. Nevertheless, the current rule makes no provision to allow a fifth place team to make the playoffs even if its record is better than that of the second place team in the other division, which occurred in 2018.

Regular season standings

Final regular season standings
Note: GP = Games Played, W = Wins, L = Losses, T = Ties, PF = Points For, PA = Points Against, Pts = Points

Bold text means that they have clinched the playoffs.
Edmonton and Hamilton have first round byes.

Grey Cup playoffs

The Edmonton Eskimos are the 1981 Grey Cup champions, defeating the Ottawa Rough Riders, 26–23, at Montreal's Olympic Stadium. Edmonton won their fourth-straight championship on a last second Dave Cutler field-goal. The Rough Riders' J.C. Watts (QB) was named the Grey Cup's Most Valuable Player on Offence and John Glassford (LB) was named the Grey Cup's Most Valuable Player on Defence. The Eskimos' Neil Lumsden (RB) was named Grey Cup's Most Valuable Canadian.

Playoff bracket

CFL Leaders
 CFL Passing Leaders
 CFL Rushing Leaders
 CFL Receiving Leaders

1981 CFL All-Stars

Offence
QB – Dieter Brock, Winnipeg Blue Bombers
RB – Larry Key, BC Lions
RB – Jim Germany, Edmonton Eskimos
SB – Joe Poplawski, Winnipeg Blue Bombers
SB – Joey Walters, Saskatchewan Roughriders
WR – Brian Kelly, Edmonton Eskimos
WR – James Scott, Montreal Alouettes
C – Al Wilson, BC Lions
OG – Val Belcher, Ottawa Rough Riders
OG – Larry Butler, Winnipeg Blue Bombers
OT – Bill Stevenson, Edmonton Eskimos
OT – Hector Pothier, Edmonton Eskimos

Defence
DT – Dave Fennell, Edmonton Eskimos
DT – Mike Raines, Ottawa Rough Riders
DE – David Boone, Edmonton Eskimos
DE – Greg Marshall, Ottawa Rough Riders
LB – Danny Kepley, Edmonton Eskimos
LB – Ben Zambiasi, Hamilton Tiger-Cats
LB – James "Quick" Parker, Edmonton Eskimos
DB – Ray Odums, Calgary Stampeders
DB – David Shaw, Hamilton Tiger-Cats
DB – Harold Woods, Hamilton Tiger-Cats
DB – Ed Jones, Edmonton Eskimos
DB – Randy Rhino, Ottawa Rough Riders

Special teams
P – Hank Ilesic, Edmonton Eskimos
K – Trevor Kennerd, Winnipeg Blue Bombers

1981 Western All-Stars

Offence
QB – Dieter Brock, Winnipeg Blue Bombers
RB – Larry Key, BC Lions
RB – Jim Germany, Edmonton Eskimos
SB – Joe Poplawski, Winnipeg Blue Bombers
TE – Joey Walters, Saskatchewan Roughriders
WR – Brian Kelly, Edmonton Eskimos
WR – Tyrone Gray, BC Lions
WR – Eugene Goodlow, Winnipeg Blue Bombers
C – Al Wilson, BC Lions
OG – Nick Bastaja, Winnipeg Blue Bombers
OG – Larry Butler, Winnipeg Blue Bombers
OT – Bill Stevenson, Edmonton Eskimos
OT – Hector Pothier, Edmonton Eskimos

Defence
DT – Dave Fennell, Edmonton Eskimos
DT – John Helton, Winnipeg Blue Bombers
DT – Mike Samples, Saskatchewan Roughriders
DE – David Boone, Edmonton Eskimos
DE – Lyall Woznesensky, Saskatchewan Roughriders
LB – Danny Kepley, Edmonton Eskimos
LB – Vince Goldsmith, Saskatchewan Roughriders
LB – James "Quick" Parker, Edmonton Eskimos
DB – Ray Odums, Calgary Stampeders
DB – Charles Williams, Winnipeg Blue Bombers
DB – Merv Walker, Calgary Stampeders
DB – Ed Jones, Edmonton Eskimos
DB – Ken McEachern, Saskatchewan Roughriders

Special teams
P – Hank Ilesic, Edmonton Eskimos
K – Trevor Kennerd, Winnipeg Blue Bombers

1981 Eastern All-Stars

Offence
QB – Tom Clements, Hamilton Tiger-Cats
RB – Rufus Crawford, Hamilton Tiger-Cats
RB – Cedric Minter, Toronto Argonauts
SB – Rocky DiPietro, Hamilton Tiger-Cats
TE – Tony Gabriel, Ottawa Rough Riders
WR – Keith Baker, Hamilton Tiger-Cats
WR – James Scott, Montreal Alouettes
C – Henry Waszczuk, Hamilton Tiger-Cats
OG – Val Belcher, Ottawa Rough Riders
OG – Bill Norton, Montreal Alouettes
OT – Doug Payton, Montreal Alouettes
OT – Ed Fulton, Hamilton Tiger-Cats

Defence
DT – Ecomet Burley, Hamilton Tiger-Cats
DT – Mike Raines, Ottawa Rough Riders
DE – Grover Covington, Hamilton Tiger-Cats
DE – Greg Marshall, Ottawa Rough Riders
LB – John Priestner, Hamilton Tiger-Cats
LB – Ben Zambiasi, Hamilton Tiger-Cats
LB – Carmelo Carteri, Hamilton Tiger-Cats
DB – Leroy Paul, Hamilton Tiger-Cats
DB – David Shaw, Hamilton Tiger-Cats
DB – Harold Woods, Hamilton Tiger-Cats
DB – Larry Brune, Ottawa Rough Riders
DB – Randy Rhino, Ottawa Rough Riders

Special teams
P – Zenon Andrusyshyn, Toronto Argonauts
K – Bernie Ruoff, Hamilton Tiger-Cats

1981 CFL Awards
CFL's Most Outstanding Player Award – Dieter Brock (QB), Winnipeg Blue Bombers
CFL's Most Outstanding Canadian Award – Joe Poplawski (SB), Winnipeg Blue Bombers
CFL's Most Outstanding Defensive Player Award – Danny Kepley (LB), Edmonton Eskimos
CFL's Most Outstanding Offensive Lineman Award – Larry Butler (OG), Winnipeg Blue Bombers
CFL's Most Outstanding Rookie Award – Vince Goldsmith (LB), Saskatchewan Roughriders
CFLPA's Outstanding Community Service Award – Ken McEachern (DB), Saskatchewan Roughriders
CFL's Coach of the Year – Joe Faragalli, Saskatchewan Roughriders

References 

CFL
Canadian Football League seasons